Sangat Singh was a Sikh warrior and martyr of Battle of Chamkaur.

Early life 
Sangat Singh was born in Punjab. His father's name was Bhai Rania and his mother was Bibi Amaro.

He got trained in shastar vidya, gatka, horse-riding, warfare and martial arts and also studied languages, e.g - Punjabi, Urdu, Sanskrit, Persian and Braj. Later, he was sent by his father to serve Guru Gobind Singh.

Battle and Death 
Sangat Singh took part in battles of Bhangani, Bajrur, Nadaun, all four battle of Anandpur Sahib, Bansali, Nirmohgarh, Sarsa and Chamkaur.

In second Battle of Chamkaur, Sikhs lost almost most soldiers and the Guru decided to go on war front but it was opposed by present Sikhs on their insistence he agreed to make a bid to escape from Chamkaur and his attire, dastar and kalgi was given to Bhai Sangat Singh in the fort. He bore a high degree of physical resemblance to Guru Gobind Singh and dressed up and disguised himself as the Guru in-order to trick the enemy.

Sangat Singh and Sant Singh only two Sikhs got left at the fort and after Guru's exit and they went on war front to Mughal army and fought against them and got martyred.

See also 
 Bhai Jiwan Singh
 Battle of Chamkaur

References 

Sikh warriors
1650 births
1705 deaths